Palghar is a town in the Konkan division of Maharashtra state, India and a municipal council. It is in the Mumbai Metropolitan Region, and since 2014 it has been the administrative capital of the Palghar district. Palghar lies on the Western Line of the Mumbai Suburban Railway in the busy Mumbai-Ahmedabad rail corridor. The town is located about 87 kilometers north of Mumbai, about 35 kilometers north of Virar and about 24 kilometers west of the Mumbai-Ahmedabad National Highway at Manor.

History 

Palgar's history is alternate with its old district Thane. Jawhar, Vasai and Palghar tehsils have a historical legacy. Vasai (then known as Bassein) was under the Portuguese Empire. Chimaji Appa, the Maratha military commander later captured Vasai fort from the Portuguese and embedded the Maratha flag on Vasai. Palghar was one of the important points in 1942 of the Chalejav campaign.

Demographics
At the 2011 Census of India, Palghar had a population of 68,930. Males numbered 36,523 (52.9%) and females 32,407 (47.1%). The literacy rate was 77.52%, higher than the national average of 59.5%; male literacy was 81.2% and female literacy 73.35%. 11.8% of the population was under 6 years of age.

Marathi is the most widely spoken language with Warli, Vadvali and Vanjari dialects. Small communities of Gujaratis and Muslims speak Gujarati and Urdu respectively.

Palghar has an urban population of 33,086 thus about 48% of the total population lives in the urbanized area.

Culture 

Kunbi, 
Bhandari, Warli (Adivasi), Katkari, Malhar Koli, Vanjari, Vadval, Mali (Sorathi) are the predominant castes in Palghar.

The Vanjaris are a nomadic tribe that have their roots in Chittorgarh, Rajasthan. Their language is distinct from standard Marathi as it has a high influence of Rajasthani and Gujarati.

Vadval is the most numerous community present in Palghar. They are said to be the descendants of Yadava dynasty of Devagiri who established themselves here. They form one of the very few Marathi-speaking communities which belong to Kshatriya varna but not the traditional 96-clan (96 - Kuli) Maratha caste.

Warli painting and famous Tarapa dance feature contribution towards art by the Warli community. Warli painting and art stretch back to a millennium. Warli art is also appreciated in foreign countries. Warlis represent the earliest settlers of the land around the present times and their culture has largely influenced the later cultures in and around the area.

The Koli (fishermen) community of Palghar is a reminder of the city's links with the Arabian sea. Fisheries form a large part of trade and diet of Palghar and also take up a major role in cultural events. The Kolis are further divided into subcastes such as Vaiti, Mangele, Bari, etc.

Art, crafts and tourism 
Tourist attractions in the district include:
 Arnala fort
 Vasai Fort
 Gambhirgad
 Kaldurg Fort
 Kelwa Beach
 Kamandurg Fort
 Shirgaon Fort
 Tandulwadi Fort
 Vajreshwari hot water spring
 Mahalakshmi Temple
 Jivdani Mata temple
 Bhavangad Fort

Economy 

The economy of Palghar is largely the primary and tertiary sector. Palghar being the seat of Taluka and District, has many government offices and people working there. Agriculture, animal husbandry, dairy, and fisheries are practiced in abundance in the rural areas around the city and fuel the economy of the city.

Palghar had also been a hub for wood smuggling in the post-independence era, a practice that has been largely curbed by the Forest department and police. Other than wood, the secluded beaches were known to attract smugglers trying to offshore their goods and enter Mumbai by road to avoid customs.

Education
The town has a number of schools and colleges, with more under construction to serve the increasing population. Palghar is the education hub of the area, with many students travelling from outside the town. The schools and colleges include:
 Tarapur Vidya Mandir & Jr. College
 

 Jawahar Navodaya Vidyalaya, Mahim
 Sonopant Dandekar Arts, V.S. Apte Commerce & M.H. Mehta Science College Palghar 
 St. John College of Engineering and Technology
 St. John College of Humanities and Sciences
 St. John Institute of Pharmacy and Research

Transport 

Palghar is well connected via road and rail transport. Palghar acts as a divisional head of Maharashtra State Road Transport Corporation, which provides direct connectivity to several towns across Maharashtra and Gujarat, including Surat, Vapi, Valsad, Vadodara, Bharuch, Ankleshwar, Anand, Mumbai, Ahmedabad, Miraj, Sangli, Pune, Vaduj, Thane, Ulhasnagar, Bhiwandi, Aurangabad, Ahmednagar, Kalyan, Alibag, Nandurbar, Bhusaval, Shirdi, and Nashik.

Palghar railway station is an important railway station on the Western Line of the Mumbai Suburban Railway, and the Ahmedabad–Mumbai main line. Along with Shuttle/Memu/EMU (local trains) services, many long-distance trains also stop here.

Sports 

Cricket is the most popular sport in Palghar. Local tournaments are held at various locations in the district.
Shardul Thakur is a cricketer from Palghar (Mahim) who plays for India, for Chennai Super Kings in the IPL and for Mumbai in the Ranji Trophy.
Aditya Tare is a wicket-keeper and a right-hand batsman from Palghar (Satpati village) who plays for Mumbai Indians in the IPL and for Mumbai in the Ranji Trophy.

See also
 2020 Palghar mob lynching

References

 
Cities and towns in Palghar district